Yeltesunovo is a rural locality (a selo) in Rozhdestvenskoye Rural Settlement, Sobinsky District, Vladimir Oblast, Russia. The population was 215 as of 2010. There are 6 streets.

Geography 
Yeltesunovo is located 38 km north of Sobinka (the district's administrative centre) by road. Stepanikha is the nearest rural locality.

References 

Rural localities in Sobinsky District
Vladimirsky Uyezd